This Time is a blues album by Robert Cray. It was released on August 11, 2009, through Vanguard Records, and Nozzle Records. It is his first studio album in four years, also featuring a reconstructed line-up. The Robert Cray band toured in the United States supporting the album. They appeared on the Late Show with David Letterman on August 18, 2009 promoting the album, and played the song "Trouble and Pain"

Track listing
"Chicken In The Kitchen" (Cray) - 6:05 
"I Can't Fail" (Cray) - 3:32
"Love 2009" (Pugh) - 6:24 
"That's What Keeps Me Rockin'" (Braungel, Schell) - 5:36 
"This Time" (Cray) - 7:22 
"To Be True" (Pugh, Cousins) - 5:14
"Forever Goodbye'" (Cray, Sue Turner-Cray) - 4:33
"Trouble and Pain" (Cray) - 4:04
"Truce" (Cousins, Hendrix Ackle) - 5:41

The Robert Cray Band
Robert Cray - Vocals and guitar
Jim Pugh - Keyboards
Richard Cousins - Bass guitar
Tony Braunagel - Drums

References

2009 albums
Robert Cray albums
Vanguard Records albums